Keyyur  is a village in the southern state of Karnataka, India. It is located in the Puttur taluk of Dakshina Kannada district. The main occupation among residents is agriculture and the cultivation of areca nut, rubber, cashews, and other crops. The climate remains cool throughout the year.

Demographics
 India census, Keyyur had a population of 5211 with 2543 males and 2668 females. Sex ratio was 1049 (females per 1000 male). Literacy rate is 99.57%.

See also
 Dakshina Kannada
 Districts of Karnataka

References

External links
 http://dk.nic.in/

Villages in Dakshina Kannada district